Automatic train protection (ATP) is a type of train protection system which continually checks that the speed of a train is compatible with the permitted speed allowed by signalling, including automatic stop at certain signal aspects. If it is not, ATP activates an emergency brake to stop the train.

See also 
 Advanced Civil Speed Enforcement System
 Anti Collision Device
 Automatic Warning System
 Automatische treinbeïnvloeding (ATB)
 British Rail's ATP system
 Continuous Automatic Warning System (CAWS)
 EBICAB
 European Train Control System (ETCS)
 Kavach
 Positive Train Control (PTC)
 Punktförmige Zugbeeinflussung (PZB)
 Train Protection & Warning System
 Train Warning System

References 

Train protection systems